”There are seven that pull the thread” is a song with words by W. B. Yeats, and music written by the English composer Edward Elgar in 1901.

The song is from Act I of a play Grania and Diarmid co-written in poetic prose by Yeats and the Irish novelist George Moore. This song and the incidental music that Elgar wrote for the play form his Op. 42.

The play was dedicated to Henry Wood, and its first performance was at the Gaiety Theatre, Dublin in October 1901.

The tiny song is for one of the characters, Laban, to sing at her spinning-wheel. Elgar accompanies Yeats' prose with delicate and imaginative orchestration: he employs muted strings, a harp, flute, clarinet, bassoon and a pair of horns. The song is unhurried and delicate, in little recitative-like sections.  The dynamic indicated is little more than a soft pianissimo.

Lyrics

Recordings

Elgar: Complete Songs for Voice & Piano Amanda Roocroft (soprano), Reinild Mees (piano)

References

Banfield, Stephen, Sensibility and English Song: Critical studies of the early 20th century (Cambridge University Press, 1985) 
Kennedy, Michael, Portrait of Elgar (Oxford University Press, 1968) 
Moore, Jerrold N. “Edward Elgar: a creative life” (Oxford University Press, 1984) 

1901 songs
Songs by Edward Elgar
Incidental music